Pangani District (Swahili language: Wilaya ya Pangani) is one of the eight districts and one of 11 administrative councils in Tanga Region in north eastern Tanzania. As of the 2012 census, the population was Pangani district was 54,025, making it the least populous district in Tanga region.  The district seat (capital) and largest settlement in Pangani district  is the town of Pangani. The district is named after the historic Pangani River.

History 
The are that is now Pangani district has been inhabited by humans for thousands of years. The area is the ancestral home to two Bantu people groups, namely the Bondei people and the Zigua. The Pangani district is known for being the site of the Middle Ages Swahili historical sites in what is now the town of Pangani.

Geography 
Pangani district is one of the smallest districts in Tanga region at 1,831 square kilometers, however, it has the longest coastline in the region. Pangani district is bordered to the north by the Muheza District, to the east by the Indian Ocean, to the south by the Pwani Region and to the west by the Handeni District.

Climate 
Pangani district is located in the tropical zone thus having a tropical savannah climate. It is classified as As by the Köppen climate classification. It has an average annual temperature of 25.7 degrees Celsius and an annual precipitation of 1271 millimetres.

Demographics 
According to the 2002 Tanzania National Census, the population of the Pangani District was 44,107. According to the 2012 Tanzania National Census, the population of Pangani District was 54,025, with population density of 29.5 persona per square kilometer.

Administrative subdivisions

Wards
As of 2012, Pangani District is administratively divided into 13 wards:

References

 
Districts of Tanga Region